Abington station is an MBTA Commuter Rail station in Abington, Massachusetts. It serves the Plymouth/Kingston Line, and is located off Center Avenue (MA 123). It serves as a park and ride stop for the towns of Abington, Rockland, and Hanover. The station opened along with the rest of the Old Colony Lines on September 29, 1997.

References

External links

MBTA - Abington
Station from Google Maps Street View

Stations along Old Colony Railroad lines
MBTA Commuter Rail stations in Plymouth County, Massachusetts
Railway stations in the United States opened in 1997